Phelps is a census-designated place (CDP) in Pike County, Kentucky, United States. The population was 1,053 at the 2000 census. It is the easternmost census-designated community in Kentucky.

Geography
Phelps is located at  (37.513969, -82.153987).

Demographics

At the 2000 census there were 1,053 people, 423 households, and 321 families living in the CDP. The racial makeup of the CDP was 99.15% White, 0.19% African American, and 0.66% from two or more races. Hispanic or Latino of any race were 0.47%.

Of the 423 households 32.2% had children under the age of 18 living with them, 61.9% were married couples living together, 10.9% had a female householder with no husband present, and 23.9% were non-families. 22.0% of households were one person and 7.6% were one person aged 65 or older. The average household size was 2.49 and the average family size was 2.90.

The age distribution was 23.6% under the age of 18, 8.0% from 18 to 24, 29.2% from 25 to 44, 27.1% from 45 to 64, and 12.3% 65 or older. The median age was 37 years. For every 100 females, there were 101.3 males. For every 100 females age 18 and over, there were 93.0 males.

The median household income was $23,125 and the median family income  was $23,472. Males had a median income of $35,313 versus $25,132 for females. The per capita income for the CDP was $10,365. About 34.8% of families and 36.2% of the population were below the poverty line, including 52.0% of those under age 18 and 7.4% of those age 65 or over.

Education
Phelps has a lending library, a branch of the Pike County Public Library.

References

Census-designated places in Pike County, Kentucky
Census-designated places in Kentucky
Mining communities in Kentucky